Ministry of Internal Affairs of Adygea (Министерство внутренних дел по Республике Адыгея) is the interior ministry of Adygea in southwest Russia. The Ministry is headquartered in 25 Zhukovsky Street in Maykop. The currently minister is Alexandre Rechisky.

History
The Militsiya in Adygea was formed on January 20, 1918 with the establishment of the Maykop City Police.

On April 14, 1918 The People's Commissariat for Internal Affairs (Народный комиссариат внутренних дел) was created as the Main Policing body.

On Jule 27, 1922 the Police of Adygea was established as the Adygea Oblast Militsiya.

In May 1992 the Directorate for Internal Affairs of Adygea (Управление внутренних дел Адыгейского облисполкома) was reorganized as Ministry for Internal Affairs of Adygea (Министерство внутренних дел Республики Адыгея). Vladimir Mikhnenko was the first minister.

In 2012 the Adygea's police celebrated his 90th anniversary.

Structure
Regional Interior Ministry
Inspection
Administration
Internal Security Operations
Control
Law Division
Information and Foreign Relations
Records and treatment Dept.
Stuff Dept.
Professional Training Center
Mobilization
Deputy Minister - Chief of Police
Deputy Chief of Police for Operations
Deputy Chief of Police for Public Security
Deputy Chief of Police

Regional Divisions
Maykop City Police Department
Maykop Region Police Dept.
Takhtaouksk Region Police Dept.
Gyaginsk Region Police Dept.
Krasnogvardeiysk Region Police Dept.
Adygea Inter-Municipal Police Department
Koshekhabell Inter-Municipal Police Department

External links
Official Website
Traffic Police
Old Website

Adygea
Adygea